Let's Get Married may refer to:

Film
 Let's Get Married (1960 film), a 1960 British comedy drama
 Let's Get Married (1926 film), an American film starring Richard Dix
 Let's Get Married (1931 film), a French comedy film directed by Louis Mercanton 
 Let's Get Married (1937 film), an American film starring Ida Lupino
 Let's Get Married (2015 film), a 2015 Chinese romance film

Song
 "Let's Get Married" (Jagged Edge song), 1999
 Let's Get Married (The Proclaimers song)
 "Let's Get Married", a song by Al Green from Livin' for You
 "Let's Get Married", a song by Bleachers from Gone Now

Television
 Let's Get Married (TV series), a Russian television program on Channel One
 , a Dutch gameshow